Bona Sforza d'Aragona (2 February 1494 – 19 November 1557) was Queen of Poland and Grand Duchess of Lithuania as the second wife of Sigismund I the Old, and Duchess of Bari and Rossano by her own right. She was a surviving member of the powerful House of Sforza, which had ruled the Duchy of Milan since 1447.

Smart, energetic and ambitious, Bona became heavily involved in the political and cultural life of Poland–Lithuania. To increase state revenue during the Chicken Rebellion, she implemented various economic and agricultural reforms, including the far-reaching Wallach Reform in the Grand Duchy of Lithuania. In foreign policy, she was allied with the Ottoman Empire and sometimes opposed the Habsburgs. Her descendants became beneficiaries of the Neapolitan sums, a loan she gave to Philip II of Spain which was never completely paid.

Childhood
Bona was born on 2 February 1494, in Vigevano, Milan, as the third of the four children of Gian Galeazzo Sforza, legal heir to the Duchy of Milan, and Isabella of Naples, daughter of King Alfonso II of Naples from the House of Trastámara. Her paternal great-uncle Ludovico Sforza, known to history as "Il Moro", usurped her father's power and sent the small family to live at the Castello Visconteo in Pavia, where her father died the same year she was born. Rumors spread that he was poisoned by Ludovico.

Bona's family moved to the Sforza Castle in Milan, where they lived under the watchful eye of Ludovico, who was afraid that Milan residents would rebel and install her popular brother Francesco. To minimize the risk, Ludovico separated the boy from the family and granted Bari and Rossano to her mother. The plans were interrupted by the Italian War of 1499–1504: King Louis XII of France deposed Ludovico and took Francesco to Paris. With nothing left in Milan, her remaining family departed for Naples in February 1500. However, the war reached the Kingdom of Naples and her maternal great-uncle, King Frederick of Naples, was deposed. Together with other relatives, Bona was temporarily hid at the Aragonese Castle on Ischia.

By April 1502, Bona was sole surviving of her siblings. She and her mother settled at the Castello Normanno-Svevo in Bari more permanently, where she started an excellent education. Her teachers included Italian humanists Crisostomo Colonna and Antonio de Ferraris, who taught her mathematics, natural science, geography, history, law, Latin, classical literature, 
theology, and how to play several musical instruments.

Marriage proposals

When the House of Sforza was restored to the Duchy of Milan in 1512, Isabella hoped to wed Bona and Duke Maximilian Sforza, thereby providing further legitimacy to Maximilian's reign. There were other proposals as well: Spanish King Ferdinand II of Aragon proposed Giuliano de' Medici and brother of Pope Leo X; Isabella counter-proposed Ferdinand's 10-years-old grandson Ferdinand of Habsburg; Pope Leo X proposed Philippe, Duke of Nemours, who would succeed to the Duchy of Savoy if his brother Charles III abdicated. 
The initial and most likely plan to marry Maximilian Sforza failed when he was deposed after the French victory in the Battle of Marignano in 1515. Pope Leo X proposed his nephew Lorenzo de' Medici, Duke of Urbino, as he hoped to install Lorenzo as Duke of Milan by using Bona's inheritance claims. However, the French hold on Milan was too strong and the plan failed.

After Polish King Sigismund I the Old was widowed in October 1515, Maximilian I, Holy Roman Emperor, didn't want Sigismund to marry another Habsburg opponent like his late wife, Barbara Zápolya. Therefore, the Emperor acted quickly and selected three suitable candidates for Sigismund: his granddaughter Eleanor of Austria, widowed Queen Joanna of Castile, and Bona Sforza. Although 36-year-old Joanna was eliminated because of her age and Eleanor's older brother instead selected King Manuel I of Portugal for her husband, Polish nobles suggested Anna Radziwiłł, widow of Konrad III of Masovia. Isabella sent Bona's old teacher, Crisostomo Colonna, and diplomat Sigismund von Herberstein to Vilnius to convince Sigismund to select Bona. They succeeded and the marriage treaty was signed in September 1517 in Vienna. Bona's dowry was very large – 100,000 ducats and personal items worth 50,000 ducats in addition to Duchy of Bari and Rossano that she would inherit after her mother's death. In exchange, Sigismund granted his future wife the towns of Nowy Korczyn, Wiślica, Żarnów, Radomsko, Jedlnia, Kozienice, Chęciny, and Inowrocław.

Jan Konarski, Archbishop of Kraków, traveled to Bari to bring Bona to Poland. The wedding per procura took place on 6 December 1517 in Naples. Bona wore a dress of light blue Venetian satin that reportedly cost 7,000 ducats. The journey to Poland took more than three months. Bona and Sigismund met for the first time on 15 April 1518 just outside Kraków.

Queen of Poland and Grand Duchess of Lithuania 
The wedding and coronation took place on 18 April 1518, but celebrations continued for a week. 
Almost from the beginning of her life in Poland, the energetic Queen tried to gain a strong political position and began forming a circle of supporters. On 23 January 1519, Pope Leo X, whom Bona had friendly relationship with from her Italian days, granted her the privilege of awarding eight benefices in five Polish cathedrals (Kraków, Gniezno, Poznań, Włocławek, and Frombork). In May 1519, the privilege was expanded to fifteen benefices. This was a very important privilege that allowed her to secure support of various officials. Three of her most trusted supporters, Piotr Kmita Sobieński, Andrzej Krzycki, and Piotr Gamrat, were sometimes known as the Triumvirate. She became openly involved in various state affairs, which did not agree with the traditional ideal of a royal wife – who used discreet manipulation in government. Although the royal couple disagreed on many domestic and foreign issues, the marriage was a supportive, successful partnership.

Domestic policy

Believing that one of the most important things needed for strengthening royal authority was appropriate revenue, Queen Bona sought to assemble as much dynastic wealth as possible, which would give her husband's financial independence to defend the kingdom from external threats without the Parliament's slow support. The royal family gained numerous estates in Lithuania and finally took over the Grand Duchy by 1536–1546. She helped to reform agriculture taxation, including uniform duties on the peasants and area measurements. These actions generated huge profits.

Wanting to ensure the continuity of the Jagiellonian dynasty on the Polish throne, the royal couple decided to make the nobles and magnates to recognise their only son, the minor Sigismund Augustus, as heir to the throne. First, the Lithuanian nobles gave him the ducal throne (ca. 1527–1528). Then, in 1529 he was crowned Sigismund II Augustus. This led to huge opposition from Polish lords, which led to the adoption of the bill that the next coronation would take place after the death of Sigismund Augustus, and that it would do so with the consent of all the noble brothers.

In 1539, Bona reluctantly presided over the burning of 80-year-old Katarzyna Weiglowa for heresy, but this event ushered in an era of tolerance. The Queen's confessor, Francesco Lismanino, assisted in the establishment of a Calvinist Academy in Pińczów.

Foreign policy
Bona was instrumental in establishing alliances for Poland, although she was rumoured to be a notorious conspirator because of her gender and Italian heritage. In addition of her good relationships with the Vatican, she sought to maintain good relations with the Ottoman Empire and had contacts with Hurrem Sultan, chief consort of Suleiman the Magnificent. It is believed that due to the good relationship between the Queens that Poland was saved from the attack of the Ottoman Army during the Italian wars.

Worried about the growing ties between the Habsburgs and Russia by 1524, Sigismund signed a Franco-Polish alliance with King Francis I of France to avoid a possible war on two fronts. Bona was instrumental in establishing an alliance between Poland and France, with the objective of recovering Milan. The negotiations came to an end and the alliance was disbanded when Francis' troops were defeated by Charles V at the Battle of Pavia in 1525.

Despite their blood relation, Bona sometimes was a fierce opponent of the Habsburgs. She advocated attaching Silesia to the Polish Crown in return for her hereditary principalities of Bari and Rossano, but Sigismund the Old didn't fully support this idea. Wanting to secure her eldest daughter in the Kingdom of Hungary, Bona successfully supported her son-in-law John Zápolya as successor against Ferdinand of Habsburg after Louis II of Hungary was killed at Mohács in 1526.

Artistic patronage

Alongside her husband's profound interest in the revival of classical antiquity, Bona was instrumental in developing the Polish Renaissance. She brought renowned Italian artists, architects and sculptors from her native country. Her most known artistic involvement were the expansion of the Palace of the Grand Dukes of Lithuania in Vilnius and the construction of Ujazdów Castle, which included a large park and a menagerie. The plans were prepared by Bartolomeo Berrecci da Pontassieve, who designed several other projects in Poland.

Queen Mother
On the 1 April 1548, Sigismund I the Old died and was succeeded by Sigismund Augustus. Mother and son had previously entered into a conflict over his marriage to Barbara Radziwiłł, a former mistress who was vehemently opposed by the nobility, though she eventually accepted her son's decision. Still, their relationship turned difficult and after her husband's death, Bona moved with her unmarried daughters to Masovia and stayed there for eight years before moving back to Bari.

Neapolitan sums

In February 1556, Bona departed Poland to her native Italy with treasures she had accumulated over 38 years. In May, she arrived to Bari and took possession of her mother's duchy. She was soon visited by envoys of King Philip II of Spain, who tried to convince her to give up the duchies of Bari and Rossano in favor of the Habsburg Spain, though she refused. However, Fernando Álvarez de Toledo, 3rd Duke of Alba, who at the time was the viceroy of Naples, feared a French attack and was raising money for troops. Perhaps having ambitions of becoming a viceroy of Naples herself, Bona agreed to lend the Duke of Alba a huge sum of 430,000 ducats at 10% annual interest. The loan was guaranteed by custom duties collected in Foggia and the agreements were signed on both 23 September and 5 December 1556.

However, the Habsburgs were determined to obtain Bari and did not intend to repay the loan. On 8 November, Bona became ill with stomach ache. On 17 November, when she was losing her consciousness, her trusted courtier Gian Lorenzo Pappacoda brought notary Marco Vincenzo de Baldis who wrote her last will. This will left Bari, Rossano, Ostuni, and Grottaglie to Philip II of Spain and large sums to Pappacoda's family. Her daughters would receive a one-time payment of 50,000 ducats, except Isabella Jagiellon, who was to receive 10,000 ducats annually. Her only son, King Sigismund II Augustus, was named as the main beneficiary but at the end he would inherit only cash, jewelry, and other personal property. The next day, however, Bona felt better and dictated a new last will to Scipio Catapani, leaving Bari and other property to Sigismund Augustus.

Bona Sforza died in the early morning of 19 November 1557, at the age of 63. Several of her servants (cook, page, majordomo, and scribe) mysteriously died as well- it is suspected the party were poisoned by trusted household members. She was buried in St. Nicholas' Basilica in Bari, where her daughter, Anna, had a tomb made in the current Renaissance style for her remains.

Affairs 
During her youth in Bari, Bona Sforza took the young Ettore Pignatelli as her lover. He was the eldest son of Alessandro Pignatelli, who in turn was the lover of her mother Isabella d'Aragona, Duchess of Milan. However, Ettore died under mysterious circumstances – it is believed that he was poisoned by Bona herself upon refusing to follow her to Poland where she intended to marry Sigismund. Widowed by her husband in 1548, Bona became involved in a romantic affair with Giovanni Lorenzo Pappacoda.

Issue
Although she didn't travel with her husband and spent three years alone in the Wawel castle, Bona was pregnant seven times during the first nine years of her marriage. Her children included:
 Isabella (18 January 1519 – 15 September 1559): Married John Zápolya, King of Hungary.
 Sigismund II Augustus (1 August 1520 – 7 July 1572): Succeeded his father as King of Poland and Grand Duke of Lithuania.
 Sophia (13 July 1522 – 28 May 1575): Married Henry V, Duke of Brunswick-Lüneburg
 Anna (18 October 1523 – 9 September 1596): Eventually succeeded her brother as Queen of Poland and Grand Duchess of Lithuania in her own right.
 Catherine (1 November 1526 – 16 September 1583): Married John III of Sweden
 Albert (born and died 20 September 1527): As a result of a fall from a horse, his mother gave birth prematurely and he died at birth.

See also

 Chicken War
 Neapolitan sums

References

 
|-

People from Vigevano
Bona
Polish queens consort
Prussian royal consorts
Assassinated Italian people
Queen mothers
Grand Duchesses of Lithuania
16th-century Italian nobility
16th-century Polish people
Burials at the Basilica di San Nicola
1494 births
1557 deaths
Italy–Poland relations
Italian emigrants to Poland
16th-century Polish women
16th-century Italian women
Daughters of monarchs